Management process is a process of setting goals, planning and/or controlling the organising and leading the execution of any type of activity, such as: 
 a project (project management process) or
 a process (process management process, sometimes referred to as the process performance measurement and management system).

An organization's senior management is responsible for carrying out its management process. However, this is not always the case for all management processes, for example, sometimes it is the responsibility of the project manager to carry out a project management process.

Steps 
Planning, it determines the objectives, evaluate the different alternatives and choose the best from them.

Organizing, define the group's functions, establish relationships and defining authority and responsibility

Staffing, recruitment or placement and selection or training takes place for the development of  members in the firm

Directing, is to give the Direction to the employees.

Controlling,Controlling involves ensuring that performance does not deviate from standards.

Coordination, it ensures that different departments and groups work in sync.

See also
Business process
Project management
Project planning

References

Management